Peroxisomal biogenesis factor 19 is a protein that in humans is encoded by the PEX19 gene.

Interactions 

PEX19 has been shown to interact with:

 ABCD1, 
 ABCD2, 
 ABCD3, 
 PEX10, 
 PEX11B, 
 PEX12, 
 PEX13, 
 PEX16, and
 PEX3.

References

Further reading

External links 
  GeneReviews/NCBI/NIH/UW entry on Peroxisome Biogenesis Disorders, Zellweger Syndrome Spectrum
 OMIM entries on Peroxisome Biogenesis Disorders, Zellweger Syndrome Spectrum